Domnall Ó Cuindlis (died 1342) was an Irish historian of the Ó Cuindlis family of brehons and scholars.

Ó Cuindlis is described in the Annals of Lough Ce as "an eminent historian". In 1342, in unknown circumstances, he "was killed by the Uí Díarmata". The latter was the dynastic name of the family of Ó Con Ceanainn (anglicised as Concannon), who ruled a district called Uí Díarmata in what is now north-east County Galway.

See also 

 Murchadh Ó Cuindlis ( 1398-1411), a scribe of the Book of Lecan and An Leabhar Breac

References 

 http://www.ucc.ie/celt/published/T100010A/index.html

14th-century Irish historians
Irish murder victims
People from County Galway
1342 deaths
Year of birth unknown
Irish-language writers